Arturo Molina may refer to:
Arturo Armando Molina (1928–2021), Salvadoran president
Arturo Molina Sosa (born 1934), Mexican gynecologist
Arturo Molina Gutiérrez (born 1964), Mexican professor and researcher
Frost (rapper) (born 1964), born Arturo Molina Jr., American rapper
Arturo Molina (footballer) (born 1996), Spanish footballer